Larry Ivie (1936–2014) was an American comics artist, writer, and collector who was active in comics fandom in the middle part of the 20th century, described by comics historian Bill Schelly as "the closest thing to an authority on comics that was available in the 1950s." He provided painted covers and other editorial material for early issues of Castle of Frankenstein magazine, then self-published the seven issues of his own newsstand magazine Monsters and Heroes, for which he drew comic stories of his own superhero Altron Boy, in the mid-to-late '60s; had his art published in the magazines  Galaxy Science Fiction and If, co-created the comic book T.H.U.N.D.E.R. Agents, and wrote several stories for Marvel Comics and the horror magazines Creepy and Eerie. Born in Salt Lake City, Utah, to biologist Wilton Ivie and his wife Aleen, he moved to New York City in the mid 1950s to attend the School of Visual Arts, and with a large personal library of comic books and correspondence via fanzines became a prominent part of New York comics fan culture. He also made amateur films of superheros, influencing the amateur films of Donald F. Glut and appearing in two of his films.  Ivie died of lung cancer in January 2014, aged 77.

References

External links

1936 births
2014 deaths
American comics artists
American comics writers
Writers from Salt Lake City
School of Visual Arts alumni
Silver Age comics creators
Deaths from lung cancer
Artists from Salt Lake City